Miracles for Sale is a 1939 American mystery film directed by Tod Browning, and starring Robert Young and Florence Rice. It was Browning's final film as a director. The film is based on a locked-room mystery novel by well-known mystery writer Clayton Rawson, Death from a Top Hat, which was the first to feature his series detective The Great Merlini. In this film, Merlini's character has been changed into Michael Morgan (The Amazing Morgan) as portrayed by Robert Young. Don Diavolo, another series character in Rawson's work under his pseudonym, Stuart Towne, appears here as Dave Duvallo.

Plot
In the late 1930s, inactive New York magician Michael "Mike" Morgan exposes fraudulent magicians and psychics who prey on the unsuspecting. When demonologist Dr. Sabbat is mysteriously murdered, Mike assists the police in developing suspects which include Tauro and Dave Duvallo - two magicians last seen with Sabbat; a couple named La Claire who perform tricks by telepathy; a psychic named Madame Rapport; and, a young lady named Judy Barkley who is in New York to prevent Madame Rapport from claiming a $25,000 prize offered by a local psychic association.

Cast
 Robert Young as Michael 'Mike' Morgan
 Florence Rice as Judy Barclay
 Frank Craven as Dad Morgan
 Henry Hull as Dave Duvallo
 Lee Bowman as Mr. Al La Claire
 Cliff Clark as Police Inspector Marty Gavigan
 Astrid Allwyn as Mrs. Zelma La Claire
 Walter Kingsford as Colonel Herbert Watrous
 Frederick Worlock as Dr. Caesar Sabbatt (Credits) / Sabbat in Film (as Frederic Worlock)
 Gloria Holden as Madame Rapport
 William Demarest as Detective Quinn
 Harold Minjir as Tauro

References

External links
 
 
 
 

1939 films
1939 mystery films
American black-and-white films
American mystery films
Films directed by Tod Browning
Films based on American novels
Films based on mystery novels
Metro-Goldwyn-Mayer films
Films about magic and magicians
1930s English-language films
1930s American films